Rasinja is a settlement and an eponymous municipality in northern Croatia in Koprivnica–Križevci County, located halfway between Koprivnica and Ludbreg.

Population

The municipality's total population is 3,267 (2011 census), in the following settlements:
 Belanovo Selo, population 38
 Cvetkovec, population 210
 Duga Rijeka, population 141
 Gorica, population 138
 Grbaševec, population 32
 Ivančec, population 63
 Koledinec, population 170
 Kuzminec, population 299
 Ludbreški Ivanac, population 62
 Lukovec, population 44
 Mala Rasinjica, population 34
 Mala Rijeka, population 31
 Prkos, population 50
 Radeljevo Selo, population 113
 Rasinja, population 876
 Ribnjak, population 50
 Subotica Podravska, population 510
 Velika Rasinjica, population 17
 Veliki Grabičani, population 103
 Veliki Poganac, population 234
 Vojvodinec, population 52

History
In the late 19th century and early 20th century, Rasinja was part of Varaždin County of the Kingdom of Croatia-Slavonia.

Religion
Serbian Orthodox Church of Saint George in the village of Veliki Poganac was built in 1722 and its bell tower was erected in 1751. Adjacent parochial house was built in 1879. Church's iconostasis was erected and painted in 1779. Church was declared protected cultural heritage of the Republic of Croatia in 1965.

References

Populated places in Koprivnica-Križevci County
Municipalities of Croatia